David Fairrington (born 18 October 1940) is an American artist. Mostly associated with his realistic portraits, Fairrington paints a variety of subjects including landscapes, still life, and western art in a range of styles including abstract, conceptual, fantasy, figurative, impressionist, pop art and romantic. He attributes artist John Singer Sargent and famed illustrator Norman Rockwell as significant influences in his work.

Early life

Fairrington was born into a military household in 1940 at Fort Lewis. His father, Ralph W. Fairrington was a career soldier in the United States Air Force. His mother was Grace L. Fairrington. Inspired by the popularity of an older brother who could draw, Fairrington tried his hand at sketching airplanes but soon discovered he could draw faces well enough that people were willing to pay him for portraits. His used this talent to help pay his way through Texas Technological College, now known as Texas Tech University. While at Texas Tech, Fairrington also served as a staff artist for the 1961 La Ventana yearbook. He graduated in 1964, with a bachelor's degree in advertising art and design. That year he was also selected as a winning artist in the Motorola National Competitive Exhibition. Fairrington spent the next spent two years working for different advertising agencies.

Vietnam Combat Art Program

In 1966 Fairrington was drafted into the United States Army. He completed basic training at Fort Polk and was assigned to the Postal Department at Fort Sill. During his off-duty hours, he took art classes at South Eastern College in Lawton, Oklahoma.

After a year at Fort Sill, Fairrington received orders sending him to the 43rd Signal Battalion based in Pleiku. While there he heard about the Vietnam Combat Artists Program and submitted an application along with a collection of drawings and paintings.  He was accepted into the program and assigned to the Army Combat Artist Team VI in Saigon.

After 60 days of temporary duty capturing his impressions in preliminary sketches, Fairrington flew to Hawaii to complete his paintings.  His work was exhibited at Ala Moana Center and Schofield Barracks before being shipped back to the Army archives in Washington, D.C. With the artwork complete, he found he still had three weeks of service left and returned to Vietnam to finish his tour of duty.

The art completed by Fairrington during his assignment as a Vietnam soldier-artist is now in the permanent US Army Art collection, maintained by the United States Army Center of Military History (CMH), Washington, D.C. Some of his work was selected for "The Art of Combat: Artists and the Vietnam War, Then and Now" exhibited at the Indianapolis Art Center from October 2000 to January 2001.

Fairrington's art was included in the exhibit "Art of the American Soldier", organized by the U.S. Army Center of Military History that was displayed at the National Constitution Center in Philadelphia, in 2010 and is now maintained online.

Military art gallery

Post-Military Art Career

In 1968, following his military service, Fairrington moved to Oakland, California, where he attended the San Francisco Art Institute.  In 1969, he secured a position with Jack Wodell Associates, a film advertising agency. In 1972, Fairrington moved to Los Angeles when Wodell Associates opened an office there.

In 1978, Fairrington and a partner, Tami Masuda, opened a small design called New York West that produced graphics for the film industry. They worked on concept and design for over 150 posters for 20th Century Fox, Warner Bros., Columbia Pictures, Universal Pictures, Sony Pictures and Metro-Goldwyn-Mayer.

In 1995, Fairrington closed the design studio so he could concentrate on painting, although he continued to do occasional freelance work. His commissions included former Los Angeles Police Chief William Bratton, California Senator Alan Lowenthal and Democratic U.S. representative, Janice Hahn.

In 2004, Fairrington and his family moved from Los Angeles to Beaumont, California, where he took over the Banning Center for the Arts in nearby Banning, California, for a year. As director, he promoted community outreach by arranging the exhibit of artwork by young developing artists with older established artists. He also supervised and collaborated with artist Lucy Blake Elahi, under the direction of artist Lori Escalera, to work with Culver Park High School students, who produced a mural called "Rivers of the World."

Fairrington teaches oil techniques and life drawing at the Desert Art Center in Palm Springs, California. He also conducts two day and week long painting workshops on the principles of portrait painting.

Fairrington has also served as a judge in the 2009 Plein Air Exhibition at the Riverside Art Museum. In 2007, Fairrington was the featured artist for three months at the Edward-Dean Museum in Cherry Valley, California. In 2010, his work was exhibited by the Arts Council of the Temecula Valley.

His commissioned portrait of Arthur Ashe, painted for tennis star John McEnroe, appeared in Sports Illustrated magazine. He also occasionally produces celebrity portraits for the Walt Disney Company's ABC Television shows. He has painted the stars of Lost, Desperate Housewives, Grey's Anatomy, Scrubs, Extreme Makeover: Home Edition and Legend of the Seeker.

Fairrington was named "Master Artist" by International Artist Magazine in 2001. He has also won first place at The National Orange Show's 2010 All-California Juried Art Exhibitionand The National Orange Show's Board of Directors' Purchase Award.

Fairrington was chosen by the U.S. government as one of the official portrait artists for employees of The Pentagon and other government agencies.

Fairrington's artwork is included in numerous corporate and private collections and is on exhibit at Jack's Fine Art & Frame in Beaumont, California.

Fairrington has been commissioned to paint dancers from several ballet companies around the United States, including School of American Ballet and New York City Ballet.

Personal life 
While teaching design at the Los Angeles County High School for the Arts, Fairrington met his wife, Lilly. The couple had one son, Nicolai. Fairrington is now divorced and currently resides in Cherry Valley, California. He is now teaching art for the University of Redlands in Redlands, CA

Gallery

External links 
David Fairrington's website
 (video)
A Long Lost Artist Found (blog post)
 (video)
 (video)

References 

1940 births
Fairrington
Vietnam Combat Artists Program
United States Army personnel of the Vietnam War
Painters from California
Fairrington
American portrait painters
Painters from Washington (state)
Texas Tech University alumni
United States Army soldiers